Adnan Dibrani, (born 12 February 1985 in Kosovo), is a Swedish politician. He is a member of the Swedish parliament for the Social Democrats. He was elected by, and represents the Halland constituency. He has studied national economy and prior to going into politics was a bank clerk. In politics he has engaged himself in reforming the taxation system. He came to Sweden as a refugee in 1989. Dibrani was 7-years old when came in Sweden from Mitrovica in 1992.

References 

Swedish people of Kosovan descent
Members of the Riksdag 2010–2014
Members of the Riksdag 2014–2018
Members of the Riksdag from the Social Democrats
1985 births
Living people
Swedish Muslims
Members of the Riksdag 2018–2022
Members of the Riksdag 2022–2026